Luís Carlos Melo Lopes (December 24, 1954 – June 27, 2016), better known as Caçapava, was a Brazilian football player in defensive midfielder role.

Clubs
 Gaúcho de Caçapava: 1972
 Internacional: 1973–1979.
 Corinthians: 1979 - 1982.
 Palmeiras: 1982 - 1983.
 Vila Nova: 1983.
 Ceará: 1984 - 1985.
 Novo Hamburgo: 1984.
 Fortaleza: 1986 - 1987.

Honours
 Campeonato Gaúcho: Four time (1974, 1975, 1976 and  1978)
 Campeonato Brasileiro Série A: (1975, 1976)
 Campeonato Paulista: 1979.
 Campeonato Cearense: 1984.

References

External links
Profile at Globo Esporte's Futpedia

1954 births
2016 deaths
Sportspeople from Rio Grande do Sul
Brazilian footballers
Association football midfielders
Sport Club Internacional players
Sociedade Esportiva Palmeiras players
Sport Club Corinthians Paulista players